Steve Spurrier Jr. (born September 26, 1971) is an American football coach who is the Offensive coordinator and Quarterback Coach at the University of Tulsa. He previously served as the wide receivers coach at Mississippi State University from 2020 to 2022.

Spurrier played college football at the Duke University as a wide receiver from 1989 to 1993. Prior to his tenure at Mississippi State, he held various assistant coaching positions at Washington State University, Western Kentucky University, the University of Oklahoma, South Carolina University, University of Arizona, Washington Redskins and the University of Florida.

Spurrier’s coaching career includes 22 postseason bowl games, including the Sugar Bowl, Fiesta Bowl, Cotton Bowl, and Orange Bowl.  Spurrier was also part of five conference championships (three SEC; two Big 12) and two national championships (Oklahoma, 2000; Florida, 1996).

Coaching career

Florida (1994–1998)
Spurrier served as a graduate assistant at the University of Florida from 1994-1996.  In 1997, Spurrier took on the role of football video assistant.  In 1998, Spurrier was elevated to special teams coach.

Oklahoma (1999–2001)
Prior to the 1999 season, Spurrier was hired as wide receivers coach by University of Oklahoma Head Coach, Bob Stoops.  Spurrier stayed on Stoops’ staff, holding the same position, through the 2001 season.

Washington Redskins (2002–2003)
Spurrier was the wide receivers coach for the Washington Redskins in 2002 & 2003, where his father Steve Spurrier, served as Head Coach.

Arizona (2004)
In May 2004, Spurrier was hired as tight ends coach at the University of Arizona under head coach Mike Stoops.

South Carolina (2005–2015)
Spurrier Jr. joined his father’s staff at the University of South Carolina in 2005.  At different times in his 11 seasons at South Carolina, Spurrier served as wide receivers coach, passing game coordinator, recruiting coordinator, & co-offensive coordinator.  Alshon Jeffrey, Deebo Samuel, Pharoh Cooper, Sidney Rice, & Kenny McKinnley are amongst some of the receivers that Spurrier coached, who played in the NFL.

Oklahoma (2016)
In March 2016, University of Oklahoma Head Coach Bob Stoops, announced that Spurrier would be returning to Oklahoma as an offensive specialist & director of high school recruiting.  Spurrier spent much of the 2016 season working closely with then Oklahoma offensive coordinator and current University of Southern California head coach, Lincoln Riley.

Western Kentucky (2017)
In December 2017, Spurrier was hired as assistant head coach/quarterbacks coach at Western Kentucky University under head coach Mike Sanford.  As quarterback coach, Spurrier continued the development of Mike White, currently an NFL quarterback for the New York Jets.

Washington State (2018–2019)
In 2018, Spurrier was hired as the wide receivers coach at Washington State University under head coach Mike Leach.

Spurrier played a big part in the 2018 record setting season that quarterback Gardner Minshew had.  Minshew finished the 2018 season as the Pac-12 single season passing leader for yards and completions.

Mississippi State (2020–2022)
On February 4, 2020, Spurrier was hired as the wide receivers coach and passing game coordinator at Mississippi State University following head coach Mike Leach.

On December 21, 2022, Mississippi State Head Coach Zach Arnett, announced that Spurrier would call the offensive plays vs. the University of Illinois in the RelaQuest Bowl.

Spurrier took over offensive play calling duties and helped Mississippi State defeat the University of Illinois, 19-10 in the RelaQuest Bowl.

Tulsa (2023-Present) 
On January 6, 2023, Brett McMurphy of ESPN reported that Spurrier had been hired as the OC/QB coach at the University of Tulsa.

Personal life
Spurrier and wife Melissa, have been married 25 years (July 19, 1997), and are the parents of triplets, Luke, Gavin, and Emmaline; Nolan; twins, Palmer and Hayden, and McKinley.  Two of Spurrier’s sons, Gavin & Luke, both decided to attend their father’s alma mater, Duke University.  Gavin plays quarterback for Duke University, while brother Luke runs cross country.  Spurrier’s father, is two time College Football Hall of Famer, Steve Spurrier.  According to former Florida players James Bates and Danny Wuerffel, Jerri Spurrier (Spurrier’s mom and wife of Steve Spurrier) makes the best chocolate chip cookies known to mankind.

References

External links
 Mississippi State profile
 Washington State profile

1971 births
Living people
American football wide receivers
Arizona Wildcats football coaches
Duke Blue Devils football players
Florida Gators football coaches
Mississippi State Bulldogs football coaches
Oklahoma Sooners football coaches
South Carolina Gamecocks football coaches
Washington Redskins coaches
Western Kentucky Hilltoppers football coaches
People from Palo Alto, California
Coaches of American football from California
Players of American football from California